Guy Palatin (born September 25, 2000) is an Israeli professional basketball player for Maccabi Rishon LeZion of the Israeli Basketball Premier League. He plays the point guard position. 

From 2018-20 he played for Hapoel Holon. In 2021 he joined  Maccabi Rishon LeZion.

International play
Palatin played for the Israeli national team during the 2016 FIBA U16 European Championship, 2017 FIBA U18 European Championship, and 2018 FIBA U18 European Championship.

References

External links
Guy Palatin at RealGM
basket.co.il profile
EuroBasket profile

2000 births
Living people
Israeli men's basketball players
Maccabi Rishon LeZion basketball players
Point guards